Omar García Azofra (born 7 September 1983) is a Spanish professional footballer who plays for SD Logroñés as a forward.

Football career
An unsuccessful Athletic Bilbao youth graduate, García played in his early years in his country for Zamudio SD, CD Alfaro and CD Logroñés, never in higher than Segunda División B. On 1 September 2008, he signed a one-year contract with League Two side Rotherham United.

García made his official debut for his new club on 1 November 2008, against Wycombe Wanderers. His next appearance came three days later in the Football League Trophy 2–0 win against Leicester City, and he also featured in the FA Cup first-round tie against Aldershot Town, on the 8th.

García made his second and last league appearance with the Millers on 15 November 2008, against Gillingham. On 10 April of the following year he was told that he could leave the English club, and he returned to Spain with CF Gandía, also in the third level.

After 14 league appearances in 2010–11 (no goals), García moved down to Tercera División and joined SD Logroñés.

References

External links
 
 Futbolme profile  
 

1983 births
Living people
Sportspeople from Logroño
Spanish footballers
Footballers from La Rioja (Spain)
Association football forwards
Segunda División B players
Tercera División players
Zamudio SD players
CD Logroñés footballers
English Football League players
Rotherham United F.C. players
Spanish expatriate footballers
Expatriate footballers in England
CF Gandía players